The 1996 All-Big 12 Conference football team consists of American football players chosen as All-Big 12 Conference players for the 1996 NCAA Division I-A football season.  The conference recognizes two official All-Big 12 selectors: (1) the Big 12 conference coaches selected separate offensive and defensive units and named first-, second- and third-team players (the "Coaches" team); and (2) a panel of sports writers and broadcasters covering the Big 12 also selected offensive and defensive units and named first- and second-team players (the "Media" team).

This was the first year of competition for the Big 12 Conference.

Offensive selections

Quarterbacks
 Koy Detmer, Colorado (Coaches-1; Media-1)
 Zebbie Lethridge, Texas Tech (Coaches-2)

Running backs
 Troy Davis, Iowa State (Coaches-1; Media-1)
 Byron Hanspard, Texas Tech (Coaches-1; Media-1)
 Ricky Williams, Texas (Coaches-1)
 June Henley, Kansas (Coaches-2)
 David Thompson, Oklahoma State (Coaches-2)
 De'Mond Parker, Oklahoma (Coaches-2)

Offensive line
 Chris Naeole, Colorado (Coaches-1; Media-1)
 Chris Dishman, Nebraska (Coaches-1; Media-1)
 Aaron Taylor, Nebraska (Coaches-1; Media-1)
 Dan Neil, Texas (Coaches-1; Media-1)
 Calvin Collins, Texas A&M (Coaches-1)
 Ben Kaufman, Texas Tech (Media-1; Coaches-2)
 Pat Augafa, Iowa State (Coaches-2)
 Tim Kohn, Iowa State (Coaches-2)
 Jason Johnson, Kansas State (Coaches-2)
 Eric Anderson, Nebraska (Coaches-2)

Tight ends
 Alonzo Mayes, Oklahoma State (Coaches-1; Media-1)
 Pat Fitzgerald, Texas (Coaches-2)

Receivers
 Rae Carruth, Colorado (Coaches-1; Media-1)
 Kevin Lockett, Kansas State (Coaches-1; Media-1)
 Isaac Byrd, Kansas (Coaches-2)
 Albert Connell, Texas A&M (Coaches-2)

Defensive selections

Defensive linemen
 Grant Wistrom, Nebraska (Coaches-1; Media-1)
 Nyle Wiren, Kansas State (Coaches-1; Media-1)
 Ryan Olson, Colorado (Coaches-1)
 Jason Peter, Nebraska (Coaches-1; Media-1)
 Brandon Mitchell, Texas A&M (Coaches-1)
 Jared Tomich, Nebraska (Media-1)
 Greg Jones, Colorado (Coaches-2)
 Keith Mitchell, Texas A&M (Coaches-2)
 Jeff Ogard, Nebraska (Coaches-2)
 Barron Tanner, Oklahoma (Coaches-2)
 Chris Akins, Texas (Coaches-2)

Linebackers
 Matt Russell, Colorado (Coaches-1; Media-1)
 Tyrell Peters, Oklahoma (Coaches-1; Media-1)
 Keith Mitchell, Texas A&M (Media-1)
 Jon Hesse, Nebraska (Media-1)
 Dat Nguyen, Texas A&M (Coaches-2)
 Ronnie Ward, Kansas (Coaches-2)

Defensive backs
 Steve Rosga, Colorado (Coaches-1; Media-1)
 Chris Canty (defensive back), Kansas State (Coaches-1; Media-1)
 Mario Smith, Kansas State (Coaches-1)
 Bryant Westbrook, Texas (Coaches-1; Media-1)
 Mike Minter, Nebraska (Coaches-2; Media-1)
 George McCullough, Baylor (Coaches-2)
 Ryan Black, Colorado (Coaches-2)
 Michael Booker, Nebraska (Coaches-2)

Special teams

Kickers
 Phil Dawson, Texas (Coaches-1; Media-1)
 Kris Brown, Nebraska (Coaches-2)

Punters
 Ty Atteberry, Baylor (Coaches-1; Media-1)
 Marc Harris, Iowa State (Coaches-2)

Return specialists
  Kalief Muhammad, Baylor (Coaches-1)
 Dante Hall, Texas A&M (Media-1)
 Andre Richardson, Oklahoma State (Coaches-2)

Key
Bold = selected as a first-team player by both the coaches and media panel

Coaches = selected by Big 12 Conference coaches

Media = selected by a media panel

See also
1996 College Football All-America Team

References

All-Big 12 Conference
All-Big 12 Conference football teams